Mircea Dumitrescu (September 3, 1926 – March 11, 2005) was a film critic, professor and essayist. He was known especially for his cinematography course accompanied by screenings in the main university cities in Romania.

Biography
Mircea Dumitrescu was born in Dumitrești, Vrancea County to Elena Şisman and Victor Dumitrescu (a physician), but he was brought up in Buzău. His father, Victor Dumitrescu, served at the "Carol I" Hospital in Dumitrești. Between 1934 and 1946, he studied in Buzău and Craiova (Liceul militar „Dimitrie A. Sturdza”), but Dumitrescu completed his high school just in the 1960s. He graduated from University of Bucharest and worked for Student's Culture House in Bucharest (1970–2005). After 1970, he supported a cinematography course (focused on the history, theory and aesthetics of film) accompanied by screenings in the main university cities in Romania: Bucharest, Iaşi, Târgu Mureş, Cluj-Napoca, Timișoara, Craiova, Braşov. Mircea Dumitrescu was a member of the Romanian Filmmakers Union (1993).

After 1992, he wrote articles, reviews, and film essays for: "Tribuna" (Cluj-Napoca), "Timpul" (Iaşi), "Tribuna Ardealului" (Cluj-Napoca), "Alternativa" (Braşov), "Monitorul" (Iaşi), "Util Expres" (Braşov), "Transilvania Expres" (Braşov), "Argument" (Cluj-Napoca), "Cuvântul libertăţii" (Craiova), "Jurnal de Mureş" (Târgu Mureş), "Monitorul de Suceava" (Suceava), "Jurnal de Vrancea" (Focşani), "Biserica şi problemele vremi" (Iaşi), "Tex–Caleidoscop" (Braşov), "Transilvania Jurnal" (Braşov), "Ideea creştină" (Iaşi), "Adevărul de Cluj" (Cluj-Napoca), "Gazeta de Transilvania" (Braşov), "Cotidianul – Week-end" (Bucharest), Revista Respiro (www.revistarespiro.com). Mircea Dumitrescu collaborated with television stations TVS Holding (Braşov) and Europa Nova (Iaşi). Dumitrescu was a member of "Asociaţia Ziariştilor Români" after 1994.

In 2001, his book of essays, "Istoria cinematografiei universale," was published by Noesis editor Remus Cernea.

Books
Mircea Dumitrescu, "Istoria cinematografiei universale. Eseuri," vol. 1, Noesis Cultural Society, 2001, 
Mircea Dumitrescu, "O privire critică asupra filmului românesc", ediţie îngrijită şi Cuvânt înainte de Mona Mamulea, Braşov, Arania, 2005,

Online works
 Istoria cinematografiei universale. Eseuri, vol. 1, Noesis, noiembrie 2001 
 Mircea Dumitrescu, "O privire critică asupra filmului românesc", Braşov, Arania, 2005

References

External links
  
 Moştenirea profesorului Dumitrescu 
 PROF. MIRCEA DUMITRESCU 
 (VIDEO!!!)O viata daruita cinematografiei Domnul Cinema - Mircea Dumitrescu si incendiara sa critica de film 
 Sorin Tudose, Prof. MIRCEA DUMITRESCU 
 CRITICĂ DE FILM Andrzej Wajda 
 Mona Mamulea, L’Enfer c’est moi 
  Cristi Puiu – Marfa şi banii de Mircea Dumitrescu

Romanian film critics
Romanian essayists
1926 births
2005 deaths
People from Vrancea County
Eastern Orthodox Christians from Romania
Members of the Romanian Orthodox Church
Romanian writers
Romanian journalists
University of Bucharest alumni
20th-century essayists
20th-century journalists